The Koryak Mountains or Koryak Highlands are an area of mountain ranges in Far-Eastern Siberia, Russia, located in Chukotka Autonomous Okrug and in Kamchatka Krai, with a small part in Magadan Oblast. The highest point in the system is the  Mount Ledyanaya, located in the Ukelayat Range, in the central part of the mountains.

Geography
The Koryak Mountains rise south of the Anadyr River, and northeast of the Kamchatka Peninsula. The Koryak Highlands are one of the largest glacial systems in the northern part of the Russian Far East.

Subranges
The system of the Koryak Mountains comprises a number of subranges, including:
Vetvey Range, highest point 
Vaeg Range, highest point 
Pakhachin Range, highest point  
Apuk Range
Vatyna Range
Penzhina Range, highest point  
Gizhigin Range, highest point  
Ichigem Range, highest point 
Pylgin Range, highest point  
Olyutor Range, highest point 
Neprokhodimy Range, highest point 
Southern Mayn Range, highest point 
Snegovoy Range, highest point 
Pikas Range, highest point 
Ukelayat Range, highest point 
Komeutyuyam Range, highest point 
Koyverelan Range, highest point 
Rarytkin Range, at the northern end, close to Lake Krasnoye.
Ukvushvuynen Range, highest point , the easternmost, close to Lake Pekulney.

Rivers
Rivers Main, Khatyrka, Velikaya and Ukelayat, as well as the Penzhina, with its Oklan and Belaya tributaries, are among the main watercourses of the Koryak Mountains.

See also
Shirshov Ridge

References

External links